One Night at Susie's is a 1930 American pre-Code drama film released by First National Pictures and directed by John Francis Dillon. The movie stars Billie Dove and features Douglas Fairbanks Jr., Helen Ware and Tully Marshall.

Plot
Susie (Helen Ware), who runs a house for gangsters, is raising Dick Rollins, the son (Douglas Fairbanks Jr.) of a dead convict. Susie has raised Dick well, making sure that he was not influenced by her gangster friends. She even gets him a job as press agent. Dick falls in love with Mary, a chorus girl, (Billie Dove). When he announces his engagement, Susie becomes infuriated, because she believes that a girl of her type will urge him on to a life of crime. Her premonitions come to fruition. Hayes (John Loder), who is producing Mary's show, gives her an engagement party. Dick is called to work, however, and Mary attends the party alone. Hayes attempts to rape her, and she shoots him in self-defense. Despite Mary's protests, Dick confesses to the murder and is convicted for manslaughter. While he is in prison, he writes a play for Mary, who tries to find a producer for the play but is turned down everywhere. Knowing how much the play means to Dick, she makes a deal with David Drake (Claude Fleming), who is willing to produce the play only if she submits to his sexual advances. The play is a success and makes Mary a star, which makes Dick happy when he hears the news. Houlihan (James Crane), who had made advances to Mary previously  but had been rejected, goes to Susie and tells her everything concerning Mary's sordid affair. At first, when Susie confronts her, Mary denies everything., but she eventually confesses and Susie promises to keep the whole affair a secret. When Dick is finally released, the lovers are happily reunited.

Cast
 Billie Dove as Mary
 Douglas Fairbanks Jr. as Dick
 Helen Ware as Susie
 Tully Marshall as Buckeye Bill
 James Crane as Houlihan
 John Loder as Hayes
 Claude Fleming as Drake
 Dorothy Mathews as chorus girl

Preservation
The film survives intact and has been broadcast on television and cable. The film was transferred to 16mm film by Associated Artists Productions in the 1950s and shown on television. A 16mm copy is housed at the Wisconsin Center for Film and Theater Research.  The film is also preserved in the Library of Congress collection.

Home media
As of December 2015 One Night at Susie's has been available on the Warner Archive DVD label.

References

External links
 
 
 
 

1930 films
First National Pictures films
Warner Bros. films
Films directed by John Francis Dillon
American black-and-white films
American drama films
1930 drama films
Films with screenplays by Kathryn Scola
1930s English-language films
1930s American films